The 1956 NCAA Men's Ice Hockey Tournament was the culmination of the 1955–56 NCAA Division I men's ice hockey season, the 9th such tournament in NCAA history. It was held between March 15 and 17, 1956, and concluded with Michigan defeating Michigan Tech 7-5. All games were played at the Broadmoor Ice Palace in Colorado Springs, Colorado.

Vic Heyliger captured his 6th and final National title with the Wolverines, all done in the first 9 years of the tournament. As of 2016 he stands as the coach with the most championships overall and the most with one team (6).

Qualifying teams
Four teams qualified for the tournament, two each from the eastern and western regions. The two best WIHL teams and a Tri-State League representative received bids into the tournament as did one independent school. 

Clarkson, who had completed a 23-0 record in the regular season, were offered a bid by the selection committee. The Golden Knights, however, had 8 four-year seniors on the team (who would not have been allowed to play in the tournament) and declined the invitation, leaving the second place team from the Tri-State League to go in their stead.

Format
The eastern team judged as better was seeded as the top eastern team while the WIHL champion was given the top western seed. The second eastern seed was slotted to play the top western seed and vice versa. All games were played at the Broadmoor Ice Palace. All matches were Single-game eliminations with the semifinal winners advancing to the national championship game and the losers playing in a consolation game.

Bracket

Note: * denotes overtime period(s)

Semifinals

Boston College vs. Michigan Tech

Michigan vs. St. Lawrence

Consolation Game

Boston College vs. St. Lawrence

Championship Game

Michigan vs. Michigan Tech

All-Tournament team

First Team
G: Lorne Howes* (Michigan)
D: Bob Pitts (Michigan)
D: Bob Schiller (Michigan)
F: Pete Aubry (Michigan Tech)
F: Tom Rendall (Michigan)
F: Ed Switzer (Michigan)
* Most Outstanding Player(s)

Second Team
G: Sarge Whittier (St. Lawrence)
D: Bill Renner (St. Lawrence)
D: Willie Tattersall (Michigan Tech)
F: Cliff Wylie (Michigan Tech)
F: Ron Stenlund (Michigan Tech)
F: Joe McLean (St. Lawrence)

References

Tournament
NCAA Division I men's ice hockey tournament
NCAA Men's Ice Hockey Tournament
NCAA Men's Ice Hockey Tournament
1950s in Colorado Springs, Colorado
Ice hockey competitions in Colorado Springs, Colorado